The 2010 Chicago Marathon was the 33rd running of the annual marathon race in Chicago, United States, held on Sunday, October 10. Over 38,000 runners took part, the most in the race's history.

Kenyan Samuel Wanjiru won the men's event with a time of 2:06:24, beating Ethiopian Tsegaye Kebede by 19 seconds. Ethiopian Atsede Baysa won the women's event with a time of 2:23:40, beating Desiree Davlia by two minutes and forty seconds.  On race day, Liliya Shobukhova crossed the finish line first in 2:20:25 more than 3 minutes ahead of Baysa but Shobukhova would eventually lose the title due to an anti-doping suspension. Wanjiru's win likely clinched him the men's championship, but Kebede could still take it if he wins or places second in the New York Marathon; this is considered unlikely since it is only four weeks from the Chicago Marathon. Heinz Frei of Switzerland won the men's wheelchair event in 1:26:56 and American Amanda McGrory won the women's in 1:47:25.

Richard Whitehead of Great Britain broke his old world record for athletes with lower-limb amputations, with a time of 2:42:52.

Over six months before the race, organizers moved up the race's start-time by half an hour to 7:30 am to help prevent heat-related injuries like those that occurred in the 2007 when more than 300 runners were hospitalized.  A red-flag warning was issued during the race, and sixty-five people were hospitalized, which is in line with other marathons. Despite the conditions, over 36,000 runners finished the  race, the most in Chicago Marathon history.

Results

Elite races
Elite Men

Elite Women

Wheelchair races
Men

Women

References

Chicago Marathon
Chicago
Mara
2010 in Illinois
2010s in Chicago
Chicago Marathon